Panolopus costatus, the Hispaniolan smooth galliwasp or common Hispaniolan galliwasp, is a species of lizard of the Diploglossidae family. It is endemic to the Caribbean island of Hispaniola (in both the Dominican Republic and Haiti).

Taxonomy
It was formerly classified in the genus Celestus, but was moved to Panolopus in 2021. With 11 subspecies, and a wide range, P. costatus may represent a species complex.

References

Panolopus
Reptiles described in 1862
Endemic fauna of Hispaniola
Taxa named by Edward Drinker Cope